OmniVis is a South San Francisco based biotechnology company that specializes in rapid medical diagnostic tests.

They produce plug-and-play diagnostic devices and test kits for cholera that will soon be used for other diseases.

Products

Cholera detection 
OmnniVis's rapid Cholera detection device can identify the presence of Vibrio cholerae in water in less than one hour (35 minutes average on one study and 47 minutes in another), whereas previous technologies take five to seven days. The device uses a process of DNA amplification and viscosity measurement and costs approximately US$10 per test.

The processing is done on a handheld device that analyzes water samples inserted into a single-use test kit.

The current design uses a novel method to address the problem of detecting a disease in a small volume of sample.

COVID-19 detection 
In May 2020, OmniVis was working on the early stages of a rapid test for COVID-19 that detects the disease in human saliva. The rapid tests uses a smartphone for processing. The project was supported by the United States Department of Agriculture. From June 2020, OmniVis was also working on a United States National Science Foundation funded initiative to detect COVID-19 from nasal swabs.

References

External links 

 Official website

Biotechnology companies of the United States
Biotechnology companies established in 2017